The 2019 Western Illinois Leathernecks football team represented Western Illinois University in the 2019 NCAA Division I FCS football season. They were led by second-year head coach Jared Elliott and played their home games at Hanson Field. They were a member of the Missouri Valley Football Conference (MVFC). They finished the season 1–11, 1–7 in MVFC play to finish in a two-way tie for ninth place.

Previous season

The Leathernecks finished the 2018 season 5–6, 4–4 in MVFC play to finish in fifth place.

Preseason

MVFC poll
In the MVFC preseason poll released on July 29, 2019, the Leathernecks were predicted to finish in eighth place.

Preseason All–MVFC team
The Leathernecks had one player selected to the preseason all-MVFC team.

Offense

Clint Ratkovich – FB

Schedule

Game summaries

at North Alabama

at Colorado State

Montana State

Tennessee Tech

Missouri State

at Indiana State

Illinois State

at Youngstown State

South Dakota

at North Dakota State

Southern Illinois

at Northern Iowa

Ranking movements

References

Western Illinois
Western Illinois Leathernecks football seasons
Western Illinois Leathernecks football